The 2018 Men's World Junior Team Squash Championships was held in Chennai, India. The event took place from 24 to 29 July 2018.

Seeds

Group stage

Pool A

Pool B

Pool C

Pool D

Pool E

Pool F

Pool G

Pool H

Knockout stage

Bracket

Semi-finals

Final

Final standing

See also
2018 Men's World Junior Squash Championships
World Junior Squash Championships

References

External links 
World Junior Squash Championships 2018 Official Website
2018 SquashInfo Page

M
Squash tournaments in India
Squash
World Junior Squash Championships
International sports competitions hosted by India